Tommarp River (Swedish: Tommarpsån) is a river in Skåne, Sweden.

References

Rivers of Skåne County